State Highway 101 (SH 101) is a  state highway in western Bent County, Colorado, United States, that connects CR K and CR 14 in Toonerville with U.S. Route 50 (US 50) in Las Animas.

Route description
SH 101 begins at  a junction with CR K and CR 14 in Toonerville. From its southern terminus it heads northerly to cross the Purgatoire River and end at US 50 in Las Animas.

Major intersections

See also

 List of state highways in Colorado

References

External links

101
Transportation in Bent County, Colorado